Júlio Eduardo Bressane de Azevedo (born February 13, 1946) is a Brazilian filmmaker and writer.

Biography
A representative of the Brazilian cinema marginal, Julio Bressane began making films as an assistant director of Walter Lima Jr., in 1965.

In 1967 Bressane debuted as director with Face to Face, being selected for the Festival of Brasilia. In 1970 he founded Belair Movies in company with fellow filmmaker Rogério Sganzerla. They chose a model of making films and low-cost production and thereby managed to run six feature films in just six months.

He came into exile in London in the early 1970s, but returned to Brazil several years later and made one film after another, using slapstick and debauchery as its main features. An acclaimed film of this period was the provocative Tabu, released in 1982. Critics consider Bressane the most scholarly of the Brazilian film directors, and his work is notable for the diversity of its narrative language. Another feature of his filmography is the comprehensive approach to historical and literary characters. He is also noted by his low-budget, short-time shootings, with an average of 11 to 14 days to make and edit a film.

His film Cleopatra was presented at the Venice Film Festival in 2007, as part of the Mostra Venezia Maestri (Venice Masters Exhibition), as well as being named best film of the 40th Festival de Brasília Film in November 2007.

Filmography

Awards
 Venice Film Festival, 2001 (Italy) – Winner of Filmcritica Bastone Bianco Award (Júlio Bressane).
 Love Film won the awards for best film, photography (Walter Carvalho) and soundtrack (Guilherme Vaz), the 36th Festival de Brasília Film in 2003
 Candango won the trophy for best film at the Festival de Brasília, by Tabu (1982) and Miramar (1997)
 Candango won the trophy for best director at the Festival de Brasilia, Miramar (1997) and St. Jerome (1999)
 Award for best screenplay to Rosa Maria Dias at the Festival de Brasilia by Days of Nietzsche in Turin

Books

  Some (1996)
 Cinemancia (2000)
 Fotodrama (2005)
 Deslimite  (2011)

References

External links
 

1946 births
Writers from Rio de Janeiro (city)
Brazilian film directors
Brazilian male writers
Living people